Elena of Montenegro (8 January 1873 – 28 November 1952) was Queen of Italy from 1900 until 1946 as wife of King Victor Emmanuel III of Italy. She was a Montenegrin princess as the daughter of King Nicholas I of Montenegro and his wife, Queen Milena.

Due to the Fascist conquest of the Ethiopian Empire in 1936 and Albania in 1939, Queen Elena briefly used the claimed titles of Empress of Ethiopia and Queen of Albania; both titles were dropped when her husband formally renounced them in 1943. With the opening of the case for her canonization, she was made Servant of God by the Catholic Church in 2001.

Biography

Early life

She was born in Cetinje, at the time the capital of the Principality of Montenegro.  She was raised in the values and unity of the family; the conversation at the table was conducted in French, and politics and poetry were discussed with equal ease; habits and relationships in the Petrović-Njegoš family did not stifle the spontaneity of characters and personalities.

She was tutored by the Swiss governess Luisa Neukomn between the age of six until the age of twelve, after which she was educated at the Smolny Institute in Saint Petersburg in Russia until the age of 18. She was interested in pastel painting, hunting and fishing. She also attended the Russian royal house and collaborated with the Russian literary magazine Nedelya by publishing poems.

Elena was described as shy and reserved but also rather stubborn. Very attached to traditions, with a sensitive soul and a lively and curious mind, she was endowed with a strong love for nature: her favourite flower was the cyclamen. She was a very tall woman of 180 cm (5-foot 11 inches).

Engagement 

In Italy, Queen Margherita worried about the marriage of her only son, the future king, and in agreement with Francesco Crispi, who was of Albanian origin and eager for a greater influence of Italy in the Balkans, they arranged the meeting between the two young people. In April 1895 Elena attended the International Art Exhibition in Venice (at which she was presented to the king and queen of Italy) and the opera – where she was presented to Prince Victor Emmanuel.

The choice can be seen as an attempt to stem the effects of marriage between relatives that afflicted a large part of the European royalty of the time, favouring the spread of genetic defects and diseases such as haemophilia.  Vittorio Emanuele III, the son of first cousins, could not have generated a healthy heir with a bride too close to him by genealogical tree. Thanks to the marriage with Elena, however, he had an heir Umberto II, not at all similar to his father as regards height (the father: 153 cm.) and health.

After another meeting in Russia, on the occasion of the coronation of Tsar Nicholas II, Vittorio Emanuele formulated the official request to Elena's father, Nicholas I.  On 18 August 1896, Elena and Victor Emmanuel were engaged during a visit of Victor Emmanuel in Cettigne.

Marriage

Being of Orthodox religion, Elena, for reasons of political opportunity and to support Queen Margherita mother of Vittorio Emanuele, left Montenegro and on 21 October 1896 with Vittorio Emanuele landed in Bari, wherein the basilica of St. Nicola, before the wedding, she converted to Catholicism from Orthodox Christianity, although her father would have preferred the conversion to be proclaimed after marriage. Her mother was so distressed by the fact that Elena had changed her religion, that she refused to come to the wedding ceremony in Rome.

Queen 

On 29 July 1900, following his father's assassination, Victor Emmanuel ascended the Italian throne. Officially, Elena assumed her husband's whole titles: she became Queen of Italy, and after Mussolini's occupations of Albania and Ethiopia she assumed the titles of Queen of Albania and Empress of Ethiopia.

Elena was described as dignified but natural and simple, and kept the simple habits of her youth in Cettigne.  She did not enjoy social life and entertainment or the life of public royal representational duties, but preferred to live a simple, quiet family life.  She was described as a loving parent, devoted in giving her children a simple upbringing, designed to prevent them from feeling superior to other children because of their birth.

To her appearance, Queen Elena was described in 1911: 
"No Queen in Europe to-day, save the Tsaritsa and Queen Victoria Eugenie, looks more a Queen than Elena. She is stately and tall, with a statuesque poise that anywhere singles her from the throng. Her hair is as black as midnight forest depths, her eyes as luminous as live coals. Her skin is like unto olives, and her hands firm and strong and large. Her shoulders are broad and she holds them squarely. The impression the woman gives is of unusual physical strength. Nor could this well be otherwise in view of her athletic training."

On 28 December 1908 Messina was hit by a disastrous earthquake. Queen Elena helped with the rescuers. She visited the scene, organized for the wounded to be taken to a Hospital ship and assisted personally to their care as nurse; she also organized a fundraiser for the victims in Rome. This helped to increase her popularity within the country.

World War I

Elena was the first Inspector of the Voluntary Nurses for the Italian Red Cross from 1911 until 1921. She studied medicine and was able to obtain a laurea honoris causa. She financed charitable institutions for people with encephalitis, tuberculosis, former soldiers and poor mothers.
She was deeply involved in her fight against disease, and she promoted many efforts for the training of doctors, and for research against poliomyelitis, Parkinson's disease and cancer.

During World War I Elena worked as a nurse and, with the help of the Queen Mother, she turned Quirinal Palace and Villa Margherita into hospitals, which functioned from July 1915 until 1919. To raise funds, she invented the "signed photograph", which was sold at the charity desks. At the end of the war, she proposed to sell the crown treasures to pay the war debts. In 1920, she founded the Elena di Savoia foundation for scholarships to the orphaned children of former railway workers or soldiers; she suggested that every woman in Italy donated some of her jewelry to the children whose fathers had been sacrificed for the nation, and she started by donating some of her own.

On 15 April 1937 Pope Pius XI gave her the Golden Rose, the most important honour given to a Catholic lady at the time. Pope Pius XII, in a condolence telegram sent to her son Umberto II upon the queen's death, defined her as a "Lady of charitable work".

World War II

In 1939, three months after the German invasion of Poland and the declaration of war by the United Kingdom and France, Elena wrote a letter to the six European queens still neutral (Queen Alexandrine of Denmark, Queen Wilhelmina of the Netherlands, Grand Duchess Charlotte of Luxembourg, Queen Elisabeth of Belgium, Queen Ioanna of Bulgaria and Queen Mother Maria of Yugoslavia) to avoid the great tragedy World War II would become.

She influenced her husband to lobby Benito Mussolini, Prime Minister of Italy, for creation of the independent Kingdom of Montenegro in 1941. In 1943 she subsequently obtained the release from a German prison of her nephew, Prince Michael of Montenegro, and his wife, Geneviève. Prince Michael had been imprisoned after refusing to become King of Montenegro under the protection of Italy.

On 25 July 1943 Victor Emmanuel III had Benito Mussolini arrested. The king left Rome on 9 September to flee to Brindisi with the help of the Allies and Elena followed her husband in his escape. In contrast, on 23 September their daughter Mafalda was arrested by the Nazis and sent to Buchenwald concentration camp, where she died in 1944.

Exile and death

Following the war, on 9 May 1946, Victor Emmanuel III abdicated in favour of their son Umberto, and the former king assumed the title of Count of Pollenzo. On 2 June 1946 a referendum resulted in 52 percent of voters favouring an Italian republic over the monarchy. The republic was formally proclaimed four days later, and the House of Savoy's reign over Italy formally ended on 12 June 1946. Elena and Victor Emmanuel III went to Egypt, where they were welcomed with great honor by King Farouk, but forced to live the rest of their lives in exile. Victor Emmanuel III died a year later of pulmonary congestion in Alexandria. Elena stayed in Egypt a short time before moving to France. There, in Montpellier, she was diagnosed with a severe form of cancer, and died in November 1952 while having surgery to treat it.

65 years after her death, on 15 December 2017, the remains of Elena were repatriated from Montpellier, to the sanctuary of Vicoforte, near Turin. The remains of Victor Emmanuel III were transferred two days later from Alexandria, and interred alongside hers.

Faith, Cause of beatification and canonization 
In recognition of her great faith and the charitable activities she supported, Pope Pius XI bestowed on her the highest honour at that time for a woman, the Golden Rose of Christianity, twice, in 1930 and 1937. In 2001, on the occasion of the opening of the celebrations for the 50th anniversary of the death of Queen Elena, the bishop of Montpellier opened the diocesan process for her beatification process.

With the opening of her cause, the late Queen has been accorded the title Servant of God.

Children
King Victor Emmanuel III of Italy and Queen Elena had 5 children:

 Princess Yolanda Margherita Milena Elisabetta Romana Maria of Savoy (1901–1986), married to Giorgio Carlo, Count Calvi di Bergolo (1888–1978), with issue;
 Princess Mafalda Maria Elisabetta Anna Romana of Savoy (1902–1944), married to Prince Philipp of Hesse (1896–1980) with issue;
 Prince Umberto Nicola Tommaso Giovanni Maria of Savoy, Prince of Piedmont, later Umberto II, King of Italy (1904–1983) married Princess Marie José of Belgium (1906–2001), with issue.
 Princess Giovanna Elisabetta Antonia Romana Maria of Savoy (1907–2000), married to Boris III, King of Bulgaria (1894–1943), with issue;
 Princess Maria Francesca Anna Romana of Savoy (1914–2001), who married Prince Luigi of Bourbon-Parma (1899–1967), with issue.

Arms and monogram

Honours

National
  House of Petrović-Njegoš: Knight Grand Cross of the Order of Prince Danilo I, Special Class
  House of Savoy: Knight Grand Cordon of the Royal Order of Saints Maurice and Lazarus
 
 : Knight Grand Cross of the Order of the Golden Spur
 : Knight of the Decoration of Honour
 : Knight Grand Cross of Justice of the Sovereign Military Order of Malta, 1st Class

Foreign
  Austrian Imperial and Royal Family:
 Dame Grand Cross of the Imperial and Royal Order of Elizabeth, 1909
 Dame of the Imperial and Royal Order of the Starry Cross, 1st Class
  Bavarian Royal Family: Dame Grand Cross of the Royal Order of Theresa
  Bulgarian Royal Family:
 Dame Grand Cross of the Royal Order of Merit
 Dame Grand Cross of the Royal Order of St. Alexander, in Diamonds, 1933
 : Grand Officer of the Order of Social Welfare, Special Class
  Iran: Order of the Sun, 1st Class
 : Dame Grand Cordon of the Order of the Precious Crown, 11 June 1909
  Spanish Royal Family: 945th Dame Grand Cross of the Royal Order of Queen Maria Luisa
  Yugoslav Royal Family: Dame Grand Cross of the Royal Order of St. Sava
 : Recipient of the Golden Rose (twice)

References

External links

The Njegoskij Fund Public Project : Private family archives-based digital documentary fund focused on history and culture of Royal Montenegro.
Crnogorska princeza Jelena

|-

|-

|-

|-

Elena of Montenegro
1952 deaths
Petrović-Njegoš dynasty
Montenegrin princesses
House of Savoy
Italian queens consort
Princesses of Piedmont
Queen mothers
Empresses and imperial consorts of Ethiopia
Women inventors
Female nurses in World War I
Knights Grand Cross of the Order of Saints Maurice and Lazarus
Knights of Malta
Grand Crosses of the Order of St. Sava
Grand Cordons of the Order of the Precious Crown
Italian Servants of God
19th-century Roman Catholics
21st-century Roman Catholics
Converts to Roman Catholicism from Eastern Orthodoxy
Eastern Orthodox Christians from Montenegro
19th-century Eastern Orthodox Christians
20th-century Eastern Orthodox Christians

People from Cetinje
19th-century Montenegrin people
20th-century Montenegrin people
19th-century Montenegrin women
20th-century Montenegrin women
Montenegrin women
Montenegrin Roman Catholics
Italian people of Montenegrin descent
Italian exiles
Royal reburials
Daughters of kings